
The Avia BH-23 was a prototype night fighter aircraft built in Czechoslovakia in 1926. The design was derived from the BH-21 day fighter, incorporating structural changes made to the BH-22 trainer, and the type was originally designated BH-22N. Searchlights and other night-flying equipment were added, but the Czechoslovak Air Force were not interested in the project and no sale resulted.

Specifications

See also

References

 
 
 Němeček, V. (1968). Československá letadla. Praha: Naše Vojsko.

1920s Czechoslovakian fighter aircraft
BH-23
Biplanes
Single-engined tractor aircraft